Mathias Autret (born 1 March 1991) is a French professional footballer who plays as a winger for  club Auxerre. He is a former France youth international, having made two appearances for the under-19 team in 2010.

Club career
On 15 May 2010, Autret agreed to a professional contract with Lorient. He signed a loan deal with Ligue 2 team Caen on 1 July 2013.

Style of play
Autret is a prototypical number 10 possessing great vision, dribbling, and passing skills. His style of play has been compared to former Ligue 1 Player of the Year Eric Carrière and to Patrick Vieira.

Career statistics

References

External links
 
 

Living people
1991 births
People from Morlaix
Sportspeople from Finistère
French footballers
Footballers from Brittany
Association football wingers
France youth international footballers
Ligue 1 players
Ligue 2 players
Championnat National 2 players
Championnat National 3 players
En Avant Guingamp players
Stade Brestois 29 players
FC Lorient players
Stade Malherbe Caen players
RC Lens players
AJ Auxerre players